Harold Stanley (4 August 1883 – 25 September 1945) was a former Australian rules footballer who played with Melbourne in the Victorian Football League (VFL).

Notes

External links 

1883 births
Australian rules footballers from Victoria (Australia)
Melbourne Football Club players
Ballarat Imperial Football Club players
1945 deaths